The 2017 Guam FA Cup is the 10th season of the Guam FA Cup knockout tournament.

The draw of the tournament was held on 1 April 2017.

Qualifying round

Round of 16

Quarter-finals

Semi-finals

Final

See also
2016–17 Guam Soccer League

References

External links

Guam FA Cup News
Guam FA Cup Results

Football competitions in Guam
Guam
FA Cup